The Albi Grand Prix is a motor race held in Albi, in the Tarn department of Southern France. The first race took place in 1933 and was won by Pierre Veyron in a Bugatti Type 51A. After the Second World War, the Grand Prix was run to Formula One regulations for many years until, following the 1955 Le Mans disaster, racing at Circuit Les Planques came to an end.

In 1959 a new circuit was constructed around the perimeter of the nearby Le Sequestre aerodrome, west of Albi. Initially held as a Formula Junior event, the Grand Prix then took place for some years under Formula Two regulations, at a time when Formula One drivers such as Jim Clark, Jack Brabham and Graham Hill regularly took part in other formulae. It then ran under Formula Three and Formula Renault regulations for many years, but in recent times has been run as a historic or GT race.

Circuits

Les Planques

The original 1933 circuit was a roughly triangular course  in length running north-east from Les Planques on the east of Albi to Saint-Juéry, then south-west to meet the Route de Millau and then back to Les Planques.

Circuit d'Albi

History of the Albi Grand Prix

Voiturette years (1933–1946)
The 1933 Albi Grand Prix was won by Pierre Veyron in a Bugatti Type 51A. Veyron went on to win the race twice more in 1934 and 1935. The event was held up until the outbreak of the Second World War, other winners including B. Bira and Luigi Villoresi. Tazio Nuvolari won the first post-war race in 1946 with a Maserati 4CL.

Formula One years (1947–1955)
From 1947 to 1955 the race would mostly be held as a Formula One event. Louis Rosier won four times during this period, and future world Champion Juan Manuel Fangio won in 1949. The 1955 Le Mans disaster brought racing at Les Planques to a halt, the circuit deemed to be unsafe.

Formula Junior years (1959–1963)
Between 1959 and 1963, at the new Circuit d'Albi, the Grand Prix was run to Formula Junior regulations, with Lotus driver Peter Arundell winning twice.

Formula Two years (1964–1973)
Between 1964 and 1973 the race was run to Formula Two regulations, apart from the 1970 event which was a Formula Three race. World Champion Jack Brabham won twice; Jim Clark, Graham Hill, Jackie Stewart and Emerson Fittipaldi were also winners.

Formula Renault years (1974–1978)
Between 1974 and 1978 the Grand Prix was run to Formula Renault regulations. Future World Champion Alain Prost was among the winners, as were René Arnoux and Didier Pironi.

Formula Three years (1979–2002)
Between 1979 and 2002 the Grand Prix was run to Formula Three regulations. Future Formula One drivers such as Philippe Alliot, Jean Alesi and Olivier Panis were among the winners.

Later years (2002–present)
From 2002 the Albi Grand Prix has variously been run for Formula Renault 2.0, GT racing and historic racing events.

References

Formula One non-championship races
Formula Two races
Formula Three races
Motorsport competitions in France
Recurring sporting events established in 1933